Robert Anthony Bruer (born May 22, 1953) is a former American football player and coach.  He played tight end in the National Football League (NFL) for the San Francisco 49ers and the Minnesota Vikings from 1977 until 1985.

Playing career
Bruer played for the San Francisco 49ers for four seasons and moved to the Minnesota Vikings for the remainder of his career.  Previously, he played two seasons in the Canadian Football League (CFL) for the Saskatchewan Roughriders.  Bruer caught Joe Montana's first NFL touchdown pass on November 18, 1979.

Coaching career
Bruer later coached football at his alma mater, the Minnesota State University, Mankato.

References

1953 births
Living people
American football tight ends
American players of Canadian football
Minnesota State Mavericks football coaches
Minnesota State Mavericks football players
Minnesota Vikings players
San Francisco 49ers players
Saskatchewan Roughriders players
Sportspeople from Madison, Wisconsin
Players of American football from Wisconsin

Minnesota State University, Mankato alumni